Stopping thought is a term in Zen referring to the achievement of the mental state of samādhi, where the normal mental chatter slows and then stops for brief or longer periods, allowing the practitioner to experience the peace of liberation.  This is normally first done during zazen meditation, but should ideally be mastered, so that it can be done regularly.

Paradoxically, Zen teaches that the attainment of this state is not through the normal method of intent and application of skill or technique.  As stated in the Zen poem Hsin Hsin Ming:

"When you try to stop activity to achieve passivity your very effort fills you with activity. As long as you remain in one extreme or the other you will never know oneness." - Hsin Hsin Ming

In other words, the process is a combination of acceptance and returning to or focusing on a familiar state, rather than a state achieved through pure force of will.

See also
Sengcan, thought to be the author of Hsin Hsin Ming
 Vitarka-vicāra, or discursive thought, which disappears in the second of the four absorptions of Buddhist meditation

External links
Meditation from the perspective of Zen Buddhism
Early Zen Poetry of Seng-ts'an

Zen Buddhist philosophical concepts
Buddhist meditation